Gail Elizabeth Emms MBE (born 23 July 1977) is a retired English badminton player who has achieved international success in doubles tournaments. A badminton player since the age of four, Emms was first chosen to represent England in 1995 and regularly played for her country until her retirement from professional sport in 2008.

Her best results were winning gold at the 2006 World Championships in Madrid, 2004 European Championships in Geneva, and a silver medal at the 2004 Olympic Games, partnering Nathan Robertson in the mixed doubles. At the 2002 Commonwealth Games in Manchester she won a bronze medal with Joanne Goode in the women's doubles and won gold as part of the England team in the mixed team event. In the English National Championships she won the mixed doubles three times and the women's doubles twice.

Early life and career 
Emms attended the Dame Alice Harpur School in Bedford, a private girls' school. She and Nathan Robertson reached the semi-finals of 1994 World Junior Championships held in Kuala Lumpur. In 1998 she graduated with a BSc (Hons) in Sports Science from Kingston University. After graduating Emms became a full-time professional badminton player with the help of national lottery funded grants paid to her by UK Sport. Her father owned a building firm that collapsed in the recession of the late 1980s leading to a sudden decline in the family standard of living. Her mother, Janice Emms (née Barton), played for the unofficial England women's national football team. Her parents divorced while Emms was in her early teens.

2004 Athens Summer Olympics 
Emms competed in badminton at the 2004 Summer Olympics in women's doubles with partner Donna Kellogg. They defeated Koon Wai Chee and Li Wing Mui of Hong Kong in the first round but were defeated by Zhao Tingting and Wei Yili of China in the second round.

She also competed in mixed doubles with Robertson. They had a bye in the first round and defeated Björn Siegemund and Nicol Pitro of Germany in the second. In the quarterfinals, Emms and Robertson beat Chen Qiqiu and Zhao Tingting of China 15–8, 17–15 to advance to the semifinals. There, they beat Jonas Rasmussen and Rikke Olsen of Denmark 15–6, 15–12. In the final, they lost to the Chinese pair Zhang Jun and Gao Ling 1–15, 15–12, 12–15 to finish with the silver medal.

2006 Commonwealth Games 
The 2006 Commonwealth Games brought Emms a silver in the team event, a bronze in the women's doubles (with Donna Kellogg) and a gold in the mixed doubles (with Nathan Robertson). An additional gold together with Robertson followed at the 2006 IBF World Championships.

2008 Beijing Summer Olympics 
Emms participated in the women's doubles with partner Donna Kellogg only to be knocked out in the first round by the Chinese pair Wei Yili and Zhang Yawen. Emms then went on to win her first match in the mixed doubles with Nathan Robertson against the Chinese world number 2 pair. Emms and Robertson won the first game 21–16 before Gao Ling and her new partner Zheng Bo hit back to win the second 21–16. The British duo found themselves 12–17 down in the decider only to recover to win 21–19. Emms and Robertson lost out on a medal at the quarter final stage against the world number 10 pair and eventual gold medalist Lee Yong-dae and Lee Hyo-jung of South Korea.

Emms retired after the 2008 Olympic Games in Beijing.

Later career 
After 2008 Emms started a portfolio career and has engaged in badminton coaching, motivational speaking, media activities, TV commentary and product endorsements. The latter includes work for SKODA cars and Adidas. Emms has worked as a TV presenter and commentator for the BBC, Sky and BT Sport. She has delivered talks on performance, teamwork and gender issues at events held by many prominent clients including the Ashridge Business School, Sainsbury's and the Thames Valley Police.

In 2013 she was appointed to the Badminton England coaching staff with a remit to develop young female prospects and mixed doubles pairs. But loss of financial support for badminton from UK Sport in 2017 resulted in cutbacks to the coaching programmes which impacted on Emms' position. She has subsequently been critical of UK Sport's strategy in allocating funds, suggesting that its emphasis on elite level players and Olympic medal results is inappropriate.

Emms has appeared on the sports-based panel show A Question of Sport and is a regular guest on Fighting Talk. On 6 March 2014, she appeared on Sport Relief's Top Dog with her dog Raffa, a Westie. They won their heat, and went on to win the semi-final against Jenni Falconer on 20 March and the final, where they competed against Sally Gunnell.

Personal life 
Emms was appointed Member of the Order of the British Empire (MBE) in the 2009 Birthday Honours for services to badminton.

She gave birth to her first child, Harry, in March 2010 and to her second child, Oliver, in May 2013. In 2015 she was living in Milton Keynes with her partner. After retiring as a badminton player in 2008 Emms has periodically suffered from depression. She has spoken about the difficulty many professional athletes have in adjusting to life after retiring from their sport while still young.

Emms is a passionate supporter of Tottenham Hotspur. She participated in the 2017 Great North Run half marathon in order to raise money for SportsAid, finishing in a time of 1 hour and 48 minutes.

Achievements

Olympic Games 
Mixed doubles

World Championships 
Mixed doubles

Commonwealth Games 
Women's doubles

Mixed doubles

European Championships 
Women's doubles

Mixed doubles

World University Championships 
Women's doubles

Mixed doubles

World Junior Championships 
Mixed doubles

European Junior Championships 
Girls' doubles

BWF Superseries 
The BWF Superseries, which was launched on 14 December 2006 and implemented in 2007, is a series of elite badminton tournaments, sanctioned by the Badminton World Federation (BWF). Successful players are invited to the Superseries Finals, which are held at the end of each year.

Mixed doubles

  BWF Superseries Finals tournament
  BWF Superseries tournament

IBF World Grand Prix 
The World Badminton Grand Prix has been sanctioned by the International Badminton Federation from 1983 to 2006.

Women's doubles

Mixed doubles

IBF International 
Women's doubles

Mixed doubles

Record against selected opponents 
Mixed doubles results with former partner Nathan Robertson against Superseries finalists, World Championships Semi-finalists, and Olympic quarterfinalists.

  Chen Qiqiu & Zhao Tingting 3–4
  Zhang Jun & Gao Ling 4–4
  Zheng Bo & Gao Ling 0–3
  He Hanbin & Yu Yang 2–1
  Xie Zhongbo & Zhang Yawen 3–3
  Jens Eriksen & Mette Schjoldager 1–2
  Joachim Fischer Nielsen & Christinna Pedersen 1–0
  Thomas Laybourn & Kamilla Rytter Juhl 4–3
  Jonas Rasmussen & Rikke Olsen 4–1
  Michael Søgaard & Rikke Olsen 3–1
  Simon Archer & Joanne Goode 1–0
  Anthony Clark & Donna Kellogg 3–1
  Flandy Limpele & Vita Marissa 2–1
  Nova Widianto & Vita Marissa 2–3
  Nova Widianto & Liliyana Natsir 4–5
  Kim Dong-moon & Ra Kyung-min 0–5
  Lee Yong-dae & Lee Hyo-jung 1–2
  Robert Mateusiak & Nadieżda Zięba 2–1
  Fredrik Bergström & Johanna Persson 1–0
  Sudket Prapakamol & Saralee Thungthongkam 6–2

References

External links 
 
 Emms's Official website
 BadmintonEngland Profile

1977 births
Living people
Sportspeople from Hitchin
English female badminton players
Badminton players at the 2004 Summer Olympics
Badminton players at the 2008 Summer Olympics
Olympic badminton players of Great Britain
Olympic silver medallists for Great Britain
Olympic medalists in badminton
Medalists at the 2004 Summer Olympics
Badminton players at the 2002 Commonwealth Games
Badminton players at the 2006 Commonwealth Games
Commonwealth Games gold medallists for England
Commonwealth Games silver medallists for England
Commonwealth Games bronze medallists for England
Commonwealth Games medallists in badminton
World No. 1 badminton players
People educated at Dame Alice Harpur School
Members of the Order of the British Empire
Medallists at the 2002 Commonwealth Games
Medallists at the 2006 Commonwealth Games